Buckskin Mountain State Park is a state park located near Parker, Arizona, US.  A second developed area of the park is known as the River Island Unit or River Island State Park.  Both park areas have shoreline on the Colorado River and views of the Buckskin Mountains.  The park provides camping and water recreation opportunities.

Both parks have been maintained with the assistance of members from the National Service Program: AmeriCorps NCCC.  The park hosted the most recent team in November, 2014 on their campsite & worked with the team to provide the park with general maintenance, inputting a fence, digging water retention pits & significantly cleaning up the beach areas.  The team & park rangers also began an irrigation project for the dog run that was scheduled to be finished in 2015.  Buckskin State Park & River Island State are primarily operated by volunteers with only a few park rangers split between the two parks.  Both sites are home to many different kinds of birds, insects, fish & plant life, as well as a winter haven for travelers from up North.

Fish species
 Largemouth Bass
 Striped Bass
 Bullhead
 Catfish (Channel)
 Redear Sunfish
 Green Sunfish
 Bluegill Sunfish
 Carp

References

External links
Arizona State Parks: Buckskin Mountain
Arizona State Parks: River Island
Arizona Boating Locations Facilities Map
Arizona Fishing Locations Map

1967 establishments in Arizona
Parks in La Paz County, Arizona
Protected areas established in 1967
Protected areas on the Colorado River
State parks of Arizona